The 1998–99 Belarusian Cup was the eighth season of the annual Belarusian football cup competition. Contrary to the league season, it is conducted in a fall-spring rhythm. It began on 18 July 1998 with the first of five rounds and ended on 29 May 1998 with the final at the Dinamo Stadium in Minsk.

Lokomotiv-96 Vitebsk were the defending champions, having defeated FC Dinamo Minsk in the 1998 final, but were knocked out in the second round by FC Belshina Bobruisk, the eventual winners.

FC Belshina Bobruisk won the final against FC Slavia Mozyr after the penalty shootout to win their second title.

Round of 32
The games were played on 18 July 1998.

|}

Round of 16
The games were played on 23 September 1998.

|}

Quarterfinals
The games were played on 29 April 1999.

Semifinals
The games were played on 11 May 1999.

Final
The final match was played on 29 May 1999 at the Dinamo Stadium in Minsk.

External links
 RSSSF

Belarusian Cup seasons
Belarusian Cup
Cup
Cup